The High Sheriff of South Yorkshire is a current High Sheriff title which has existed since 1974. The holder is changed annually every March.

For around 1,000 years the entire area of Yorkshire was covered by a single High Sheriff of Yorkshire. After the Local Government Act 1972 the title was split to cover several newly created counties, including South Yorkshire. Within the area Hallamshire had been unique in that it had a High Sheriff of Hallamshire from 1962 until 1974.

Below is a list of the sheriffs.

List of High Sheriffs

 1974-1975 John Basil Peile
 1975-1976 Edward John Thornely Taylor
 1976-1977 John Mark Mansell Jenkinson
 1977-1978 Eric Wilkes
 1978-1979 Nigel Haywood Wilton Lee
 1979-1980 Peter Edward Reynard
 1980-1981 Charles Gerard Buck
 1981-1982 Joye Powlett Smith
 1982-1983 Sir Basil Edward Rhodes
 1983-1984 The Hon. Edward Neil Turner
 1984-1985 Richard Neale Horne
 1985-1986 Jeremy Ronald Archdale
 1986-1987 The Hon. Mark Robin Balfour
 1987-1988 James Edward Eardley
 1988-1989 William Hugh Wentworth Ping
 1989-1990 John Anthony Boddy
 1990-1991 Stewart McKee Hamilton
 1991-1992 Ian Stephen Porter
 1992-1993 David Beatson Clark
 1993-1994 Christopher Shelley Barker
 1994-1995 Michael Gordon Samuel Frampton
 1995-1996 Peter Wilton Lee
 1996-1997 William George Antony Warde-Norbury
 1997-1998 Michael John Mallett
 1998-1999 Kathryn Elizabeth Riddle
 1999-2000 David Baxter Shaw
 2000-2001 Ian Geoffrey Norton
 2001-2002 Adrian M. C. Staniforth
 2002-2003 Marian Rae
 2003-2004 David Barker Moody of Ivas Wood, Stainborough, Barnsley 
 2004-2005 Pamela Liversidge
 2005-2006 Sarah Elizabeth Lee
 2006-2007 John Biggin
 2007-2008 Jonathan C. V. Hunt
 2008-2009 Dr Robert John Giles Bloomer, OBE, of Woodsetts
 2009-2010 Mrs Helena Muller of Slade Hooton, near Laughton-en-le-Morthen
 2010-2011 Anthony Paul Cooper of Sheffield
 2011-2012 Andrew Jackson Coombe of Sheffield
 2012-2013 Mrs Julie Ann Kenny, CBE of Sheffield
 2013–2014 Lady Sykes of Hope Valley
 2014–2015 John Clive Bramah of Lindrick Dale, Worksop, Nottinghamshire 
 2015–2016 John Raymond Holt of Bessacarr, Doncaster
 2016–2017 Dr Julie MacDonald of Sheffield 
2017–2018 Stephen Ingram of Sheffield 
2018–2019 Barry Reginald Eldred 
2019–2020 John Pickering of Baslow
2020–2021 Mrs Carole Diane O'Neill of Bawtry
2021–2022
2022–2023 Lieutenant Colonel Robert Alfred McPherson, MBE
2023–2024 Professor Jaydip Ray

References

External links
HighSheriffs.com
High Sheriff of South Yorkshire

Local government in South Yorkshire
South Yorkshire
South Yorkshire
High Sheriff